Commandant's Quarters, also known as Quarters "A", is a historic home located at the Philadelphia Naval Shipyard, Philadelphia, Pennsylvania. It was built in 1874–1875, and is a three-story, painted brick dwelling in the Italian Villa-style.  A porch was added in 1901.  It features an off-center square tower, slate covered gable roof, bracketed waves, and a bay window.  It was an officer's residence until June 1960.

It was added to the National Register of Historic Places in 1976.

On November 1, 2021, as part of National Homeless Awareness Month, Philadelphia mayor Jim Kenney urged that the Biden Administration convert the Commandant's Quarters into a homeless shelter. On November 26, 2021, President Biden announced that he approved of the mayor's initiative. On December 20, 2021, the proposal was introduced in the House of Representatives by Rep. Dwight Evans (D-PA) and in the Senate by Sen. Bob Casey, Jr., and enjoys the support of the Congressional Progressive Caucus.

References

Houses on the National Register of Historic Places in Philadelphia
Military facilities on the National Register of Historic Places in Philadelphia
Italianate architecture in Pennsylvania
Houses completed in 1875
South Philadelphia